Ludlow is a constituency in Shropshire represented in the House of Commons of the UK Parliament since 2005 by Philip Dunne, a member of the Conservative Party.

History
From its 1473 creation until 1885, Ludlow was a parliamentary borough. It was represented by two burgesses until 1868, when it was reduced to one member.

The seat saw a big reduction in voters between 1727 when 710 people voted to the next contested election in 1812 when the electorate was below 100.  The 1832 Reform Act raised the electorate to 300-400.

The parliamentary borough was abolished in 1885, and the name transferred to the new county "division" (with lower electoral candidates' expenses and a different returning officer) whose boundaries were expanded greatly to become similar to (and a replacement to) the Southern division of Shropshire.

The seat was long considered safe for the Conservatives with the party winning by large majorities from the 1920s until 1997 when the majority was reduced to under 6,000. When the sitting Conservative MP stood down in 2001 it was won by a Liberal Democrat. Ludlow was regained by a Conservative in the 2005 general election, held with a greatly increased majority five years later which was almost doubled in 2015.

In the 2016 referendum on the UK's membership of the European Union, Shropshire, which the constituency entirely forms a part of, voted to leave the European Union by 56.9%.

Boundaries and profile

1885–1918: Parts of the Boroughs of Ludlow, Bridgnorth, and Wenlock, the Sessional Divisions of Bishop's Castle, Brinstree South and Stottesden Chelmarsh, Burford, Clun and Purslow, Munslow Lower and Upper, and Stottesden Cleobury, and parts of the Sessional Divisions of Ovens and Stottesden.

1918–1950: The Boroughs of Ludlow, Bridgnorth, and Bishop's Castle, the Urban District of Church Stretton, and the Rural Districts of Bridgnorth, Burford, Church Stretton, Cleobury Mortimer, Clun, Ludlow, and Teme.

1950–1974: The Boroughs of Ludlow, Bridgnorth, Bishop's Castle, and Wenlock, the Urban District of Church Stretton, and the Rural Districts of Bridgnorth, Clun, and Ludlow.

1974–1983: The Rural Districts of Bridgnorth, Clun and Bishop's Castle, and Ludlow.

1983–1997: The District of South Shropshire, and the District of Bridgnorth.

1997–2010: The District of South Shropshire, and the District of Bridgnorth wards of Alveley, Bridgnorth Castle, Bridgnorth East, Bridgnorth Morfe, Bridgnorth West, Broseley, Claverley, Ditton Priors, Glazeley, Harrington, Highley, Kinlet, Much Wenlock, Morville, Stottesdon, and Worfield.

2010–present: The District of South Shropshire, and the District of Bridgnorth wards of Alveley, Bridgnorth Castle, Bridgnorth East, Bridgnorth Morfe, Bridgnorth West, Broseley East, Broseley West, Claverley, Ditton Priors, Glazeley, Harrington, Highley, Much Wenlock, Morville, Stottesdon, and Worfield.

nb. in April 2009 the districts of South Shropshire and Bridgnorth (together with their wards) were abolished; the constituency's extent however is still constituted by reference to them, and will be until the next completed review of constituencies in England.

The Ludlow constituency is situated entirely within the county of Shropshire in England.

It covers a large, rural area dotted with market towns, the largest of which are Ludlow and Bridgnorth (which was a borough constituency until 1885), each having a population of just over 10,000. The other towns — all with a population of under 5,000 — are Broseley, Clun, Bishop's Castle (a 'rotten borough' constituency until 1832), Cleobury Mortimer, Much Wenlock (former seat of the borough constituency of Wenlock until 1885 and notable for its part in the history of the modern Olympic Games movement), Craven Arms and Church Stretton.

On its northeast border (just beyond Broseley) is the Ironbridge Gorge (notable for its part in the Industrial Revolution), just to the south of the large new town of Telford. The Guardian encapsulates the seat in a nutshell as "Big, rural, hills and small towns, increasingly middle class." Other than the Telford borough constituency, Ludlow borders onto similarly rural county constituencies, including Montgomery on the other side of the border with Wales.

The constituency covers most of the south area of Shropshire Council (without Shifnal and Albrighton).

The most recent boundary changes took place at the 1997 general election, when a part of the Bridgnorth district was removed to The Wrekin constituency.

Proposed changes: Under constituency boundary proposals announced in September 2016, ahead of the next general election, the Bridgnorth, Much Wenlock and Broseley areas of the seat were to merge into a new constituency called Telford, Wellington and The Wrekin, and the ward of Chirbury and Worthen into the Shrewsbury constituency, while the remainder will amalgamate with the North Herefordshire constituency to form a new seat called Ludlow & Leominster.

Members of Parliament

MPs 1473–1660

Constituency created (1473)

MPs 1660–1868

MPs 1868–1885
Constituency reduced to one Member (1868)
 1868-1885 George Windsor-Clive,
Constituency reorganized (1885)

MPs since 1885

Elections

Elections in the 2010s

Elections in the 2000s

Elections in the 1990s

Elections in the 1980s

Elections in the 1970s

Elections in the 1960s

Elections in the 1950s

Elections in the 1940s

General Election 1939–40:
Another general election was required to take place before the end of 1940. The political parties had been making preparations for an election to take place from 1939 and by the end of this year, the following candidates had been selected;
Conservative: George Windsor-Clive
Liberal:
Labour:

Elections in the 1930s

Elections in the 1920s

Elections in the 1910s

Election results 1868-1918

Elections in the 1860s

Elections in the 1870s

Elections in the 1880s

Elections in the 1890s

Elections in the 1900s

Elections in the 1910s 

General Election 1914–15:

Another General Election was required to take place before the end of 1915. The political parties had been making preparations for an election to take place and by July 1914, the following candidates had been selected; 
Unionist: Rowland Hunt
Liberal:

Election results 1832-1868

Elections in the 1830s

Clive succeeded to the peerage, becoming 2nd Earl of Powis and causing a by-election.

Elections in the 1840s
Alcock's election was declared void on petition, due to treating, on 12 May 1840, causing a by-election.

Elections in the 1850s

 
 

Clive resigned to contest the 1854 by-election in South Shropshire, causing a by-election.

Elections in the 1860s
Herbert resigned by accepting the office of Steward of the Chiltern Hundreds, causing a by-election.

Botfield's death caused a by-election.

Elections before 1832

See also
Parliamentary constituencies in Shropshire

Notes

References

Sources
UK Polling Report Ludlow constituency
The Guardian Ludlow constituency profile and election results

Parliamentary constituencies in Shropshire
Constituencies of the Parliament of the United Kingdom established in 1473
Ludlow